In set theory, the kernel of a function  (or equivalence kernel) may be taken to be either

 the equivalence relation on the function's domain that roughly expresses the idea of "equivalent as far as the function  can tell", or
 the corresponding partition of the domain.

An unrelated notion is that of the kernel of a non-empty family of sets  which by definition is the intersection of all its elements:
 
This definition is used in the theory of filters to classify them as being free or principal.

Definition

For the formal definition, let  be a function between two sets.

The  is 

A family is called  and is said to have  if its  is not empty.  
A family is said to be  if it is not fixed; that is, if its kernel is the empty set.

Quotients

Like any equivalence relation, the kernel can be modded out to form a quotient set, and the quotient set is the partition:

This quotient set  is called the coimage of the function  and denoted  (or a variation).

As a subset of the square

Like any binary relation, the kernel of a function may be thought of as a subset of the Cartesian product 
In this guise, the kernel may be denoted  (or a variation) and may be defined symbolically as

The study of the properties of this subset can shed light on

Algebraic structures

In topology

If  is a continuous function between two topological spaces then the topological properties of  can shed light on the spaces  and 
For example, if  is a Hausdorff space then  must be a closed set.

A space is compact if and only if the kernel of every family of closed subsets having the finite intersection property (FIP) is non-empty; said differently, a space is compact if and only if every family of closed subsets with F.I.P. is fixed.

See also

References

Bibliography

 
  

Abstract algebra
Basic concepts in set theory
Set theory
Topology